AGC 198691 is a small galaxy with the one of the smallest known metallicities. It has a nickname of Leoncino as it is near Leo Minor. The galaxy appears blue due to the presence of several bright blue stars. There is also an HII region present that contains oxygen. It is important as an indicator of the kind of galaxies first formed in the Universe.

References

Dwarf galaxies
Leo Minor